Dundaga is a Parish of Ularara County in north west New South Wales, Australia. The main  economic activity of the parish is agriculture, with the Ardoo and the Salisbury Downs Station  . the parish is at 29°57′35″S 143°24′02″E.

History
The Parish is in the traditional lands of the Bandjigali and Karenggapa people.
The Burke and Wills expedition were the first Europeans to the area.

Geography
The parish has a Köppen climate classification of BWh (Hot desert).

References

Parishes of Ularara County
Far West (New South Wales)